Dorothy Angus (1891–1979) was a Scottish embroidery artist

Biography
Anna Dorothy Angus was the daughter of the Presbyterian Minister James Angus in Stirling, Scotland and was born in 1891. Angus attended Edinburgh College of Art. She went on to lead the department of Embroidery and Weaving in Gray's School of Art, Aberdeen in 1920. Angus taught there from 1920 until 1955. She was considered a transformative figure in British embroidery after the arts and crafts movement. During her tenure in the school, Angus taught Kath Whyte who credited her with showing her the possibilities of stitchery and textiles. Angus died in Scotland on 24 April 1979.

Sources

1891 births
1979 deaths
People from Stirling
Alumni of the Edinburgh College of Art
Embroiderers
20th-century Scottish women artists